Agua Dulce (Spanish for "Sweet Water") is a census-designated place in Los Angeles County, California, United States. Agua Dulce is on the Pacific Crest Trail. The ZIP code is 91390 (shared with Green Valley and far northern Santa Clarita), and the area code is 661.

Geography 
Vasquez Rocks is located in Agua Dulce. The Pacific Crest Trail, which runs from Mexico to Canada, goes through Agua Dulce.

History
On June 1, 2021, a shooting occurred at Los Angeles County Fire Department Station 81 in Agua Dulce. Firefighter Jonathan Tatone shot and killed a fellow firefighter and wounded a fire captain.

Demographics

At the 2010 census Agua Dulce had a population of 3,342. The racial makeup of Agua Dulce was 2,854 (85.4%) White (75.5% Non-Hispanic White), 59 (1.8%) Black, 24 (0.7%) Native American, 78 (2.3%) Asian, 3 (0.1%) Pacific Islander, 223 (6.7%) from other races, and 101 (3.0%) from two or more races. Hispanic or Latino of any race were 611 people (18.3%).

The census reported that 3,314 people (99.2% of the population) lived in households, 28 (0.8%) lived in non-institutionalized group quarters, and no one was institutionalized.

There were 1,201 households, 355 (29.6%) had children under the age of 18 living in them, 795 (66.2%) were opposite-sex married couples living together, 72 (6.0%) had a female householder with no husband present, 58 (4.8%) had a male householder with no wife present.  There were 64 (5.3%) unmarried opposite-sex partnerships, and 10 (0.8%) same-sex couples or partnerships. 200 households (16.7%) were one person and 73 (6.1%) had someone living alone who was 65 or older. The average household size was 2.76.  There were 925 families (77.0% of households); the average family size was 3.06.

The age distribution was 645 people (19.3%) under the age of 18, 310 people (9.3%) aged 18 to 24, 588 people (17.6%) aged 25 to 44, 1,336 people (40.0%) aged 45 to 64, and 463 people (13.9%) who were 65 or older.  The median age was 47.3 years. For every 100 females, there were 101.7 males.  For every 100 females age 18 and over, there were 102.0 males.

There were 1,277 housing units at an average density of 55.9 per square mile, of the occupied units 1,058 (88.1%) were owner-occupied and 143 (11.9%) were rented. The homeowner vacancy rate was 1.2%; the rental vacancy rate was 3.4%.  2,929 people (87.6% of the population) lived in owner-occupied housing units and 385 people (11.5%) lived in rental housing units.

According to the 2010 United States Census, Agua Dulce had a median household income of $103,333, with 2.5% of the population living below the federal poverty line.

Education
Acton-Agua Dulce Unified School District:
Vasquez High School, Acton
High Desert Middle School, Acton
Meadowlark School, Acton
Agua Dulce Elementary School, Agua Dulce

Government

Filming location

Vasquez Rocks has long been used as a popular filming location by the Hollywood movie industry, most notably The Flintstones movie, Mel Brooks' Blazing Saddles, The Invaders episode "The Saucer", and the Star Trek episode "Arena." The 1971 movie Duel filmed extensively in the area, as was the western film More Dead Than Alive. Other films shot in the area are Rat Race, Bill & Ted's Bogus Journey and The Immaculate Conception of Little Dizzle. The History channel shoots the popular reality TV show "Top Shot" in the hills and canyons on the north side of the valley. Reno 911 has filmed in locations off of Soledad Canyon Road.

The Agua Dulce area has played host to music video shoots, including those for Tom Petty and the Heartbreakers "You Got Lucky", Bloodhound Gang's "Your Only Friends Are Make-Believe", Weird Al Yankovic's "I Love Rocky Road", and various Nike commercials. L.A. based rockers and "Rat Pack" recording artist "Roxanne" filmed "Super Bad" at the Diamond View Ranch in Agua Dulce.

Vasquez Rocks got its name from the famous bandit Tiburcio Vásquez who used them as a hideout.

Most recently, Agua Dulce was used as the primary setting for Jordan Peele’s 2022 horror sci-fi film Nope. The main characters in the film are horse wranglers that often work on movie shoots that happen around Agua Dulce.

Transportation
Agua Dulce has a general aviation airport known as Agua Dulce Airpark. The Airpark and surrounding area was the location for the ABC game show 101 Ways to Leave a Gameshow which premiered on 21 June 2011.

References

External links
Agua Dulce Town Council
Township of Agua Dulce
Acton/Agua Dulce News, local newspaper
 (Photos, text, TV shows)
Agua Dulce Vineyards
Vanguard News Agua Dulce and Acton news online
Weather information for Agua Dulce and Acton

Census-designated places in Los Angeles County, California
Census-designated places in California
Sierra Pelona Ridge